Podocarpus pendulifolius is a species of conifer in the family Podocarpaceae. It is endemic to Venezuela. Its common names include Pino Carbón and Pino Hayuco.

This tree grows in rainforest habitat, sometimes at high elevation just below the páramo. At elevation it may take a dwarfed form, but otherwise it may grow to 20 meters in height.

References

pendulifolius
Endangered plants
Endemic flora of Venezuela
Taxonomy articles created by Polbot
Plants described in 1948